The Hwasong-8 is a North Korean missile claimed to be mounting a hypersonic glide vehicle, which was first tested on 14 September 2021. The first launch occurred in September, in a month with a total of four missile launches. As it is supposed to be a hypersonic missile, the missile significantly increases the threat that North Korea can put on South Korea, as the higher speed allows it to reach its target in shorter time and additional maneuverability would give it a better chance at defeating missile defenses. Japanese tracking data from a test launch suggest it is a hypersonic ballistic missile, as North Korea described it.

Design

Background 
The plans to launch 'hypersonic' missile were already indicated in the 8th Congress of the Workers' Party of Korea as part of the Five-Year Plan for Defense Science Development, where Kim Jong-un also listed other weapons, such as solid-fuel intercontinental ballistic missiles. Although North Korea already has hypersonic missiles with the KN-23 and KN-24, gliding vehicles are likely more able to survive missile defenses, and the experience from these short-range missiles would have helped the development of this missile.

Missile

As launched 
The missile has been reported to be based on either a shortened Hwasong-14 first stage, or a Hwasong-12. However, the distance between the verniers and the main chamber on the motor suggest that the base of the missile is the Hwasong-14, as it has a slightly longer gap between those. Compared to the original Hwasong-14, the fuel tanks of the main stage would have been shortened by around a quarter.

The hypersonic vehicle is mounted on top of the missile, and has a shape typical to other such vehicles, such as the DF-ZF, with fins for the aerodynamic control of the vehicle while in flight. However, as data for the trajectory of the missile was not released, it is impossible to determine the trajectory of the reentry vehicle, although the missile was unlikely to have flown over Japan in a flatter trajectory, while a lofted trajectory is unsuitable for testing such vehicles, as the glide vehicle would then reenter at a near-vertical angle.

Nonetheless, the missile is still an important demonstration of missile technology, as it was the sixth consecutive successful flight of the Paektusan (RD-250) rocket motor, which is also used by the Hwasong-12, -14 and -15 but also demonstrated other technologies, such as the ampoulisation of fuel, where fuel can be loaded into the missile months or years before a launch, reducing the time for preparing a launch of a liquid fuel missile. However, the actual impact of ampoulisation may have been overstated, as it appears that rather than the Soviet method of fueling and sealing the submarine-launched ballistic missile at the factory; instead, what is likely used is just the use of storable liquid fuel, which has probably already been practised on the Hwasong-10 and onwards, or the addition of membranes to seal off the propellent tank until launch. The use of 'ampoules' also signifies the importance of liquid fueled missiles in North Korea, that it is unlikely to develop a fully solid-fuel missile force, furthered by the fact that North Korea has had more experience with developing liquid fuel missiles.

According to the Joint Chief of Staff, the missile 'could be intercepted', if it flies at a speed of Mach 3. However, if it can reach hypersonic speeds, it would be able to reach the southern regions of South Korea in around a minute, compared to five or six for a Scud missile, which could be too short a time to alert missile defences.

As displayed at Self-Defence 2021 
The missile displayed at the defence exhibition in October 2021 had some noticeable differences, compared to the version that was launched in September. In the exhibition, the warhead was most likely mounted on a Hwasong-12 and the missile was seen mounted on a MAZ-547, also used by the Hwasong-12, though that is a 'significantly' longer missile than was tested in September. It is unknown whether the main stage of the rocket used for the Hwasong-8 launch would be used for future launches, or be used for different payloads in the future.

Impact 
The launch of the missile also served a political purpose, in demonstrating the government's ability to continue bolstering its deterrence, showing the accomplishments while also potentially giving legitimacy and prestige at a time where there is much attention paid towards hypersonic missiles. It also likely served an international purpose, as the launch had indeed attracted a wide range of attention, such as 'joining a race headed by major military powers to deploy the advanced weapons system', as Reuters wrote, or that it 'could change the military equation in East Asia', according to a CNN commentary. However, the majority of ballistic missiles of North Korea already reenter at hypersonic speeds, but the still improve chances in survival of the warhead, although these reentry vehicles are significantly more expensive than a traditional reentry vehicle, and is unlikely to form more than a small part of its missile force. This has also appeared to be part of a growing arms race in Korea, with this missile demonstrating its technological prowess over South Korea.

List of Hwasong-8 test 
There has been one known test so far:

Hypersonic Missile Type 2

Background 
North Korea first tested maneuverable reentry vehicles (MaRVs) in 2017, with the KN-18, a Hwasong-5 fitted with a maneuverable reentry vehicle. North Korea claimed successful launch test since it hit the target with only 7 error. In this test, it was claimed that the missile reached a height of 169 km for a range of only 60 km, but what was actually tracked was likely the booster stage, rather than the reentry warhead, and it was the booster stage that was tracked tumbling, after separating from the warhead. This was likely due to not taking into consideration the separating warhead, as the original Scud missiles do not have a separating warhead.

As displayed at Self-Defence 2021 
In October 2021, this missile was displayed in Self-Defence 2021 between Hwasong-12 and Pukguksong-5 At that time, Korean researchers assessed that this missile is anti-aircraft carrier missile with MaRV At the same event, photos of TEL and launching tests of this missile was also shown on the board with blurred name tag. This name tag suggests this missile already has officially designated name in North Korea because North Korean double arrow brackets '《》' which used for missile name designation was shown on the name tag.

As Launched 
On 5 January 2022, North Korea tested another version of hypersonic missile in Chagang-do. Korean researchers named this missile 'Hypersonic Missile Type 2(극초음속 미사일 2형)' since North Korean naming tradition uses 'type(형)' rather than 'number(호). This missile was also shown in Self-Defense-2021 besides Hwasong-12. After the official briefing one anonymous official asserted that this missile only has MaRV technology that the Hyunmoo-2C has, and the terminology 'Hypersonic' does not match this missile. The Japanese Defense Ministry's initial assessment suggested that the missile flew , while the day after the launch the KCNA reported that it made a -long lateral movement before hitting a target 700 km away. This could account for the range discrepancy if the glider separation happened at low altitude and so was not picked up by Japanese sensors.

The shape of the reentry vehicle is totally different from Hwasong-8, this having a conical shaped RV. It suggests that North Korea is trying to develop two different types of hypersonic missiles. From this point of view, American researcher Jeffrey Lewis assessed that conical shape of this missile's warhead seems to be a maneuvering reentry vehicle that has high maneuverability. Also he claimed that framing this missile into 'hypersonic' may mislead to focus speed of this missile. Technically speaking, the missile can be classed as hypersonic, as it exceeds Mach 5 in speed, stays within the atmosphere during the entire flight, and is able to conduct at least one maneuver that deviates from the initial flight direction. However, the shape and relatively modest turning maneuvers demonstrated are more consistent with an MaRV than a boost-glide vehicle (BGV) like the Hwasong-8's RV; although comparatively less maneuverable, an MaRV is a simpler design.

Just days after the first test, on 10 January 2022 the Hypersonic Missile Type 2 was launched into the Sea of Japan. South Korea's JCS claimed the missile flew 700 km at a maximum speed of around Mach 10; although they had claimed North Korea exaggerated the details of their previous test, with this one they stated it had demonstrated "more advanced capability" compared to the last test, though how was not explained. While observers believe North Korea is still years away from developing a credible hypersonic system, Kim's attendance and state media's description of the launch as a "final test-fire" could indicate that the weapon may be operational deployed relatively soon. Japanese tracking data showed the missile turned sharply before landing in the sea, suggesting it was a hypersonic ballistic missile, as North Korea described it.

List of Hypersonic Missile Type 2 tests

See also 
 DF-17 and DF-ZF

References 

Surface-to-surface missiles
Hypersonic aircraft
Ballistic missiles of North Korea
Weapons and ammunition introduced in 2022